Black Mascara Eyes is the second EP by English indie rock/synthpop band Propellers. It was released on 15 July 2013.

On 6 July 2013, "Black Mascara Eyes" was played on BBC Radio Kent by Jacob Rickard as the record of the week.

Music video 

A music video for the song "Black Mascara Eyes" was released on 1 July 2013. It was directed by Duncan Howsley.

Track listing

Personnel
Propellers
 Max Davenport – lead vocals
 Archie Davenport – guitar
 Charlie Simpson – bass guitar
 Jimmy Goodwin – keyboards
 Will Wilkinson – drums

References

2013 EPs
EPs by British artists